In Between Seasons is a 2016 South Korean drama film directed by first-time director Lee Dong-eun. The film is a remake of his own graphic novel. It made its world premiere at the 21st Busan International Film Festival and won KNN Award.

Synopsis
Soo-hyun (Ji Yoon-ho) is in a coma after an accident while on a trip with Yong-joon (Lee Won-keun). His mother Mi-kyung (Bae Jong-ok) soon discovers that his close friend Yong-joon is actually his boyfriend.

Cast
 Bae Jong-ok as Mi-kyung
 Lee Won-keun as Yong-joon
 Ji Yoon-ho as Soo-hyun
 Park Won-sang as Jin-gyu
 Seo Jeong-yeon as Hee-yeong
 Woo Ji-hyun as Han-sung 
 Kim Ye-eun as Ji-yeon 
 Kwon Dong-ho as Kyung-joon
 Kim Ja-young as Geum-sun
 Baek Ji-won as Sook-jung 
 Park Hye-jin as Ms Park 
 Kim In-kwon as Manager Lee
 Bae Yong-geun as Homeroom teacher

Awards and nominations

References

External links
 

In Between Seasons at Naver Movies 

2016 films
2010s Korean-language films
South Korean drama films
2016 LGBT-related films
South Korean LGBT-related films
Films based on manhwa
Myung Films films
LGBT-related drama films
2016 directorial debut films
2016 drama films
2010s South Korean films